Lowest common factor may refer to the following mathematical terms:
 Greatest common divisor, also known as the greatest common factor
 Least common multiple
 Lowest common denominator